Kokoyakyu: High School Baseball is a 2006 documentary film about high school baseball in Japan, the pastime that has turned into an obsession. The film follows two schools as they compete and head towards the 2003 (86th annual) tournament.

Kokoyakyu: High School Baseball was directed by Kenneth Eng and written/produced by Alex Shear. It was shown on PBS in the US in 2006 as part of its POV series.

References

External links 
 Kokoyakyu: High School Baseball on IMDb
 P.O.V. Kokoyakyu: High School Baseball - PBS's site dedicated to the film

2006 films
2006 documentary films
2000s sports films
Documentary films about baseball
POV (TV series) films
High school baseball in Japan
Documentary films about Japan
2000s English-language films
2000s American films